
Wieluń County is a unit of territorial administration and local government (powiat) in Łódź Voivodeship, central Poland. It came into being on January 1, 1999, as a result of the Polish local government reforms passed in 1998.

As of 2006 its total population is 78,260, out of which the population of Wieluń is 24,347 and the rural population is 53,913.

Neighbouring counties
Wieluń County is bordered by Sieradz County to the north, Łask County to the north-east, Bełchatów County and Pajęczno County to the east, Kłobuck County to the south-east, Olesno County to the south, and Wieruszów County to the west.

Administrative division
The county is subdivided into 10 gminas (one urban-rural and nine rural). These are listed in the following table, in descending order of population.

References
Polish official population figures 2006

 
Land counties of Łódź Voivodeship